Kinsey Ridge is a flat-topped, partly ice-covered ridge in the middle of Strauss Glacier, near the coast of Marie Byrd Land, Antarctica. It was mapped by the United States Geological Survey from surveys and U.S. Navy air photos, 1959–65, and was named by the Advisory Committee on Antarctic Names for James H. Kinsey, a United States Antarctic Research Program auroral scientist at Byrd Station, 1963.

See also
Nichols Rock

References

Ridges of Marie Byrd Land